Jared Schuurmans (born August 20, 1987) is an American track and field athlete who competes in the discus throw. He was the American national discus champion in 2015.

Schuurmans won an NAIA discus title in 2010 while at Doane College. He was the silver medallist at the 2014 Pan American Sports Festival.

Career

Early life and college
Raised in Norfolk, Nebraska, the son of Gary and Connie Schuurmans, he was trained by his father, who was also an athlete. He attended Norfolk Senior High School. After having had an initial focus on the decathlon in his youth, he won state titles and set high school records in the discus throw. He studied history at Doane College and represented the school athletically.

In 2008 he ranked second in the discus at the National Association of Intercollegiate Athletics Championships and was in the top ten of the NAIA shot put both indoors and out. A new school record came at the start of the season and he raised his national profile with a second-place finish at the 2009 Drake Relays. He then improved to third in the shot put at the NAIA Outdoor Championships, but fell to fourth in the discus. In his final year as a college athlete he achieved his best results. He also moved up the national rankings with 16th at the 2010 USA Outdoor Track and Field Championships.

Early professional career
After graduation, Schuurmans continued with the discus throw on a professional basis. The experience was an encouraging one for him, as he believed he could get close to the top of the sport with better preparation. He joined the National Athletic Institute's United States Olympic Training Center in Chula Vista in 2013 and began training with former Olympic discus champion Mac Wilkins – who had been a childhood idol of Schuurmans'. This mark raised him to seventh place in the American seasonal rankings by Track and Field News. He was 51st on the world lists for 2013. Schuurmans' comparatively slim build for an American discus thrower led journalist Martin Bingisser to identify a trend towards smaller, more technique-led throwers in the country, with that year's American champion Lance Brooks being another example. Schuurmans also stated that throw practice was by far the most important part of his training for the sport, rather than weight training.

Schuurmans began to compete with greater consistency in 2014 and threw beyond sixty meters in nearly all his competitions that year. A new personal record of  came in Chula Vista in April, but he also had several other throws beyond 63 meters that year. With no World Championships or Olympics being held that year, he instead made his debut on the international track and field circuit, coming fourth at the Grande Premio Brasil Caixa de Atletismo in Brazil ahead of United States Olympian Jason Young. He earned his first national selection that year, being part of the team for the Pan American Sports Festival in Mexico. Schuurmans ranked 33rd internationally for the season and fifth among American men.

First national title
He made his IAAF Diamond League debut in 2015 at the Prefontaine Classic, coming seventh among an international field. This also guaranteed his selection for the World Championships that year. Schuurmans threw  to place 29th in 2015 World Championships in Athletics – Men's discus throw.

Personal records
Discus throw –  (2015)
Shot put indoor –  (2010)
Shot put outdoor –  (2010)

Discus progression
2015: 
2014: 
2013: 
2011: 
2010: 
2009: 
2008: 
2007:

National titles
USA Outdoor Track and Field Championships
Discus throw: 2015

International competitions

Personal life
Jared lives in Portland, OR where he is a pro team sales manager for Kabuki Strength. He has two dogs. A Boston terrier named Mochi and a French Bulldog named Indiana Jones.

Jared has served on the committee for the Tortuga Pirate festival. He is the acting treasurer for the Pacific Northwest chapter of the festival.

References

External links

Living people
1987 births
People from Norfolk, Nebraska
Sportspeople from Nebraska
American male discus throwers
American male shot putters
Doane University alumni
Athletes (track and field) at the 2015 Pan American Games
World Athletics Championships athletes for the United States
USA Outdoor Track and Field Championships winners
Pan American Games track and field athletes for the United States